George Hirthler is an American writer.  He is best known for writing the novel The Idealist, which earned him the Pierre de Coubertin medal from the International Olympic Committee.

Hirthler began researching the Olympic Games in 1989. His novel The Idealist was published by the Ringworks Press in 2016. On June 23, 2022, he was awarded the Pierre de Coubertin medal along with the artist Rolf Lukaschewski.

References 

Living people
Place of birth missing (living people)
Year of birth missing (living people)
American writers
Recipients of the Pierre de Coubertin medal
20th-century American male writers
21st-century American male writers